Niobrara County is a county in the U.S. state of Wyoming. As of the 2020 United States Census, the population was 2,467, making it the least populous county in Wyoming. Its county seat is Lusk. Its eastern boundary abuts the west lines of the states of Nebraska and South Dakota.

History
Niobrara County was created on February 21, 1911, of area annexed from Converse County. Its organization was established in 1913.

The county was named for the Niobrara River, which rises near Lusk.

Recently in 2006, Niobrara County was the site for a creepypasta known as "The Wyoming Incident."

Geography

In comparison to the state of Rhode Island,  the county has more than twice the land area, with approximately 1/500 of the population.

Adjacent counties

Weston County – north
Custer County, South Dakota – northeast
Fall River County, South Dakota – east
Sioux County, Nebraska – southeast
Goshen County – south
Platte County – southwest
Converse County – west

Major Highways

National protected area
Thunder Basin National Grassland (part)

Demographics

2000 census
As of the 2000 United States Census, of 2000, there were 2,407 people, 1,011 households, and 679 families in the county. The population density was 1 person per square mile (2.6/km2). There were 1,338 housing units at an average density of 0.5 per square mile (0.2/km2). The racial makeup of the county was 98.05% White, 0.12% Black or African American, 0.50% Native American, 0.12% Asian, 0.50% from other races, and 0.71% from two or more races. 1.50% of the population were Hispanic or Latino of any race. 35.1% were of German, 18.7% English, 11.2% Irish and 5.7% American ancestry.

There were 1,011 households, out of which 27.10% had children under the age of 18 living with them, 57.60% were married couples living together, 6.00% had a female householder with no husband present, and 32.80% were non-families. 29.50% of all households were made up of individuals, and 14.10% had someone living alone who was 65 years of age or older.  The average household size was 2.28 and the average family size was 2.81.

The county population contained 22.60% under the age of 18, 6.10% from 18 to 24, 26.00% from 25 to 44, 26.60% from 45 to 64, and 18.70% who were 65 years of age or older. The median age was 43 years. For every 100 females there were 95.20 males. For every 100 females age 18 and over, there were 88.80 males.

The median income for a household in the county was $29,701, and the median income for a family was $33,714. Males had a median income of $25,909 versus $17,016 for females. The per capita income for the county was $15,757. About 10.70% of families and 13.40% of the population were below the poverty line, including 15.00% of those under age 18 and 15.60% of those age 65 or over.

2010 census
As of the 2010 United States Census, there were 2,484 people, 1,069 households, and 659 families in the county. The racial makeup of the county was 96.5% white, 0.8% American Indian, 0.4% Asian, 0.2% black or African American, 0.5% from other races, and 1.6% from two or more races. Those of Hispanic or Latino origin made up 2.1% of the population. In terms of ancestry, 41.5% were German, 19.0% were English, 17.7% were Irish, 6.6% were Swedish, and 3.0% were American.

Of the 1,069 households, 23.2% had children under the age of 18 living with them, 50.4% were married couples living together, 7.4% had a female householder with no husband present, 38.4% were non-families, and 34.5% of all households were made up of individuals. The average household size was 2.12 and the average family size was 2.71. The median age was 46.1 years.

The median income for a household in the county was $45,813 and the median income for a family was $57,153. Males had a median income of $41,898 versus $30,323 for females. The per capita income for the county was $22,885. About 6.3% of families and 11.5% of the population were below the poverty line, including 17.9% of those under age 18 and 13.3% of those age 65 or over.

Communities

Towns
Lusk (county seat)
Manville
Van Tassell

Census-designated place
Lance Creek

Unincorporated communities
 Keeline
 Riverview

Politics
Like almost all of Wyoming, Niobrara County is overwhelmingly Republican. No Democratic presidential candidate has won Niobrara County since Franklin D. Roosevelt beat Alf Landon in 1936 by thirty-eight votes, and none since Lyndon Johnson in 1964 has attained thirty percent of the county's vote.

The Wyoming Department of Corrections Wyoming Women's Center is located in Lusk. The facility was operated by the Wyoming Board of Charities and Reform until that agency was dissolved as a result of a state constitutional amendment passed in November 1990.

See also

National Register of Historic Places listings in Niobrara County, Wyoming
Wyoming
List of cities and towns in Wyoming
List of counties in Wyoming
Wyoming statistical areas

References

 
1913 establishments in Wyoming
Populated places established in 1913